{{Infobox school
| name = Tabor Academy
| image = 
| established = 1876
| type = Private, boarding
| head_name = Headmaster
| head = Anthony "Tony" Jaccaci
| city = Marion
| state = Massachusetts
| country = US
| motto = All-A-Taut-OVincit Semper Veritas(Truth Always Conquers)
| campus_type = Suburban
| enrollment = 514
| faculty = 86
| class = 12 students
| ratio = 6:1
| athletics = 23 interscholastic, 15 instructional & club
| colors = Crimson & Black  
| mascot = Seawolves
| athletics_conference = New England Preparatory School Athletic Council
| homepage = TaborAcademy.org}}

Tabor Academy is an independent preparatory school located in Marion, Massachusetts,  United States. Tabor is known for its marine science courses. Tabor's location on Sippican Harbor, Buzzards Bay, has earned it the name of "The School by the Sea". The Wall Street Journal in 2007 ranked Tabor as one of the world's top 50 schools to prepare students to gain acceptance to America's most elite universities. Tabor participates in the Independent School League (ISL) and is a member of the New England Preparatory School Athletic Council
.

History
Taber's vision
Tabor Academy was founded in 1876 as a school for children from Marion, Massachusetts, by a bequest in the will of Elizabeth Sprague (Pitcher) Taber, a wealthy widow and benefactress of the town. Article 27 of her will stated, "I have lately caused to be erected on a lot owned by me in Marion Lower Village, a building ... to be known as 'The Tabor Academy'." She named the school after Mount Tabor, a mountain of biblical importance near the Sea of Galilee. From its creation, the academy was co-educational just as Mrs. Taber had intended, established "to provide better and more complete facilities than had heretofore existed or were likely to exist for thorough education in the higher branches of English knowledge".

The first headmaster was Clark Phelps Howland of Yale University, who reported in 1884 that "It is the aim of the school to give thorough instruction, and to encourage in its pupils a desire for the real rather than the showy, and to develop the moral as well as the intellectual element." The initial tuition fee for the Academy was $24, or $300 for students who wished to board in the headmaster's home. While Elizabeth Taber did not stipulate any particular religious affiliation for the academy, Howland claimed that Tabor "will probably always be under the management of those who sympathize with the Congregational faith." Howland was succeeded by Dana Marsh Dustan, Dartmouth B.A. 1880, A.M. 1883 (1893–1901), Nathan Chipman Hamblin, Harvard B.A. 1892 (1901–1910) and Charles Edward Pethybridge, Amherst B.A. 1906 (1910–1916).

The Lillard years

Tabor was reorganized in 1916 as an independent secondary school for boys under the tenure of headmaster Walter Huston Lillard, who came to Tabor from Phillips Academy and was educated himself at Dartmouth College and Oxford University, is responsible for creating the first long-range vision for the future of the Academy: one that excluded girls.

Lillard turned Tabor into an all-boys' school and cancelled plans to make the Academy the town of Marion's school  and vowed to keep it a privately endowed and operated institution. In the 1930s, Lillard orchestrated a trade with the town of Marion. The original Academy buildings were deeded to the town (now the Elizabeth Taber Library and Marion Town Hall) and were traded for the current waterfront location in order to allow the academy to expand and grow. He acquired the surrounding cottages and plots of land in order to secure the academy's future expansion' the area had increased ten-fold by the end of his tenure in 1942. Among other contributions to the school was his design of the current seal of the school, which shows a full-rigged ship and the motto "All-a-taut-o". He selected the seal as an image to students to "sail towards broader horizons" and the motto because of its nautical meaning as the state of a vessel when everything is shipshape and accounted for.

Lillard was responsible for the creation of the International Schoolboy Fellowship in 1927, the first established international student exchange program for American schoolboys. He was chairman of the program which he formed in conjunction with headmasters from schools in England, France and Germany and eventually invited fifteen other New England prep schools to join as well. He took all boys who "made good" during the academic year on the annual cruise to France to partake in the exchange and brought English schoolboys to study at the Academy during the year. Lillard believed that "One American boy in a French community for a summer brings home a new understanding of French tradition and ideals, which he communicates to his schoolfellows. Friendship and tolerance are bred by intimacy, we cannot begin too young." After his years at Tabor, Walter "Cappy" Lillard went on to work for the United Nations in Vienna as the Chief of the Resettlement Division of the International Refugee Organization.

In recent years
The school was, until the late 1940s, a maritime school where uniformed boys performed morning and evening drill as well as pursuing a classical academic curriculum. When it returned to its original ideals as a rigorous, college preparatory boarding and day school, it still retained its status as a Naval Honor School. It was designated a Naval Honor School in 1941 by Secretary of the Navy Frank Knox, and remains only one of two secondary schools which still hold the distinction.

The headmasters who followed Lillard and continued his vision of expansion and growth were James W. Wickenden (1942–1976), Peter M. Webster B.A. Texas M.A.T. Yale (1976–1989) and Jay S. Stroud B.A. Carleton College, M.A. Dartmouth College, Ed.M Columbia University (1989–2012). In 2002, Stroud commented on the experience of living and learning at Tabor, "Our unparalleled location on the edge of the sea creates our metaphor for education. While some of our students literally study marine biology or celestial navigation, sail boats both large and small, row crew shells or swim off Tabor's docks, all our students undertake voyages of the mind and spirit. Tabor reminds us all that daily life is about the largest visions possible. It is about widening the horizon, redefining the possible, developing the courage to undertake great voyages. All of us who live here are fortunate to have both the joy and the possibility of adventure in the tides that rise at our front door every morning. It is the right place for a school." Stroud retired after the class of 2012. John Quirk was selected by the Board of Trustees to be the headmaster following Stroud's retirement. After a drunk driving incident in early 2020, Quirk was placed on leave  until the school selected Julie Salit as interim headmaster. In December of 2020, Anthony Jaccaci was announced as the new headmaster.

Campus

The campus and location of the Academy is one of the most recognizable and famous features of Tabor. Its open and ungated campus is divided into three sections by Front Street and Spring Street. The dormitory of Lillard Hall, the Johnson Dining Room, the Fireman Performing Arts Center, Hoyt Hall, the Marine Science Center, the Martin Fields and two underclassmen dormitories form the waterfront portion of the campus. Across Front Street is the academic and athletic core of the campus consisting of the Academic Center, the Hayden Library, the Math and Science Center, the Fish Center for Athletics, the Health Center, the Braitmayer Art Center, the Hoyt Fields, the Admissions House and some dormitories. "Upper Campus" is the area across Spring Street and consists of the Wickenden Chapel, a chemistry lab, the Hutchinson tennis courts, the James D. Gowing track, the Chapel fields and dormitories which appear to be cottages or private homes from the outside. The lack of gates and fences creates a blending of the campus with the surrounding village.

The dormitories at Tabor Academy range from small houses with as few as five students, to larger dormitories with as many as 40 students, each mixed with freshmen, sophomores, juniors and seniors. Each dormitory has three faculty "dorm parents", at least one of whom lives in the dormitory with their family alongside the students. Both single and double rooms are available for students to choose in the housing lottery. Additionally, selective underclassmen serve as proctors who live in the dormitories to assist the younger students with the adjustment to boarding life and to serve as a medium between the students and the faculty.

Athletics
Tabor Academy fields 55 different teams in 23 interscholastic sports and another 15 instructional programs. The school has the Fish health and athletic center, which includes an indoor hockey rink, fitness center, weight room, wrestling room, eight squash courts, field house, basketball gymnasium, football field, four basketball courts, student lounge and grill, athletic offices, a resident athletic trainer, locker rooms, team rooms and an attached health center and infirmary. Tabor also has the waterfront on Sippican Harbor in Marion for swimming in the spring and summer months, and is used for the training of the sailing and rowing teams.

Rowing
In 1919, Tabor was one of the first American prep schools to formally establish a rowing program. The strong rowing history at Tabor dates back almost a century. Both the men's and the women's teams have been active participants in the Henley Royal Regatta in Henley-on-Thames, UK. The men won the Princess Elizabeth Challenge Cup in 1965, the Thames Challenge Cup in 1936, 1937 and 1939 and have made it to the finals in both numerous times. In 1939, the New York Times reported on Tabor's dominance on the international level, stating that "It is almost a maxim nowadays that either Tabor Academy or Kent School will win the Thames Challenge Cup race for eight-oared crews." In August 1938, Tabor's status as an international power in schoolboy rowing was confirmed by its participation in one of the first recorded international schoolboy competitions on American waters when a crew of Radley College oarsmen traveled across the Atlantic via the Cunard Line RMS Aquitania to race the Tabor Academy crew on Sippican Harbor in Marion.

Throughout the 1930s and 1940s Tabor competed regionally against rival prep schools, with its strongest rival being Kent School, faced in numerous Henley finals and American championship regattas. During this period, in order to seek out a higher level of competition, Tabor raced against crews from Harvard University, Yale University and M.I.T. The relationship between Tabor and Harvard can be traced back to 1931 when Tabor traveled to England with the Harvard crew to race at Henley and used one of the Crimson's shells in competition.

In 1967, the Tabor oarsmen were poised to win their second Henley victory in three years. Rowing hard races until the finals they faced a well-rested Eton College crew and lost by ¾ of one boatlength. Another famous race was the 1947 Thames Challenge Cup final at Henley. Coming after the destruction of World War II, many of the British crews did not have sufficient food after war rationing. Tabor thought the honorable decision was to train under the same calorific restrictions as the British crews. They still managed to reach the finals where they lost to traditional rival Kent School, who brought along their own provisions from the US, but won wide support from the British fans and press for their sportsmanship.

Tabor is one of eleven schools to have a guest room at the famed Leander Club, in Henley-on-Thames. Each room is named after, and designed in the colors of and features various memorabilia from a historically significant rowing school or university. Among the other schools with rooms at Leander are Harvard, Yale, Brown, Oxford, Cambridge and Kent. In recent years, Tabor has continued to win NEIRA championships, win invitations to the USRowing Youth National Championships and travel to England to race at the Henley Royal Regatta on a regular basis.

Honours
 Henley Royal Regatta, Thames Challenge Cup 1936, 1937, 1939
 Henley Royal Regatta, Princess Elizabeth Challenge Cup 1965

Ice hockey
Tabor's men's ice hockey team, three time New England Champions, has produced over 24 NCAA Division 1 and NHL caliber players over the years. The men's and women's team practice and compete in the Travis Roy arena on campus. On August 1, 2012, Tabor alumnus Jayson Megna signed a 2-way contract with the Pittsburgh Penguins. Colleen Coyne, 1998 Olympic Gold Medalist in women's ice hockey, is a Tabor graduate.

Sailing
The Tabor sailing team has won several national championships and produced Olympic medalists such as Charlie Ogletree who won silver at the 2004 Olympic Games in Athens, Greece.

Wrestling
The Tabor wrestling program has also enjoyed a successful history under the direction of coach Dr. F. Timothy Walsh. Walsh was recently inducted into the National Wrestling Hall of Fame for his career while a coach at Amherst College, M.I.T. and Tabor. He finished his last four years at Tabor with a 72–12 record and during his tenure won numerous Class A championships and produced many National Prep School All Americans, and more National Prep Champions than any other New England Prep School as of 2011. The program has also enjoyed recent success both in the Class A league, as well as in New England under the new head coach, former Tabor wrestler and national prep champion, Conan Leary.

Basketball
Since the early 1990s, the boys' and girls' basketball teams have consistently been competitive in Class A of the New England Preparatory School Athletic Council.

Former Seawolves are currently playing for NCAA Division I, II and III schools such as the University of Connecticut, the University of South Carolina, Yale University, Harvard University, Columbia University, Brown University, Princeton University, the University of Pennsylvania, Johns Hopkins University, Georgetown University, Dartmouth College, Amherst College, Williams College, Colby College, Middlebury College among others.

Students can choose from the following sports and non-active alternatives. Most sports are offered at the varsity, junior varsity and thirds levels.

Fall sports
Football
Cross country running
Association football (soccer)
Field hockey
Active alternatives
S.S.V. Tabor Boy
Dance
Instructional Program

Winter sports
Basketball
Ice hockey
Squash
Wrestling
Active alternatives
Winter conditioning

Spring sports
Sailing
Crew
Lacrosse
Baseball
Softball
Tennis
Golf
Track and field
Active alternatives
S.S.V. Tabor BoySenior conditioning
Dance

Fall non-active alternatives
Art
Ceramics
Drama
Music alternative
Yearbook

Winter non-active alternatives
Art
Ceramics
Model United Nations
Community service
Debate
Drama
Music alternative
Photography
Yearbook

Spring non-active alternatives
Art
Ceramics
Communications
Music alternative
Photography
Yearbook

Notable alumni
The alumni of Tabor have a farreaching influence in a number of different fields. Those who have passed through Tabor have gone on to become candidates for the Presidency of the United States, billionaires and tycoons of business, Pulitzer Prize winning authors, Olympians and other influential people in the areas of business, government, culture and sport. A 2009 report by the Boston Business Journal showed that two of the top six largest companies (in terms of annual revenue) in Massachusetts had a Tabor graduate as CEO.

Academics and writing
Halton Arp '45, astronomer
Stephen F. Brown, senior lecturer at the MIT Sloan School of Management
Donald Redfield Griffin, Harvard professor, founder of the theory of cognitive ethology
Thomas Powers '58, author, journalist, intelligence expert, and recipient of the Pulitzer Prize.
Mike Stewart, novelist

Business
Paul Fireman '62, billionaire, founder and President of Reebok
John Fish '78, President of Suffolk Construction Company
Edward Johnson, III, '50, billionaire, Chairman of Fidelity Investments, member of the Boston Brahmin Perkins bloodline

Entertainment
Devon Barley '09, singer, finalist on season one of The Voice''
Arthur Chen, actor
David Chokachi, actor
Marc Friedman, instrumentalist and composer
Chris Hawkins, British journalist and BBC Radio host
Travis Roy, ice hockey player
Sally Taylor, singer-songwriter
The Slip, a contemporary avant-rock trio (formed while students at Tabor)

Government
Ed Clark, 1980 candidate for President of the United States on the libertarian ticket
Samuel Loring Morison, Naval intelligence official
Matthew A. Reynolds, former Assistant Secretary of State (Legislative Affairs)
Bruce Sundlun '38, governor of Rhode Island, 1991-95.
Sir William J.M. Shelton, member of British Parliament and was the Parliamentary Private Secretary under Margaret Thatcher
Kevin White, mayor of Boston (1968–84)

Sports

Colleen Coyne, 1998, Nagano Olympian in hockey for women's ice hockey.
Eric Nickulas, former NHL hockey player
Gia Doonan, 2020, Tokyo Olympian in rowing
Rob Douglas, former world speed sailing record setter.
Blake Sloan, former NHL hockey player
Torin Francis, professional basketball player
Deron Quint, former NHL hockey player
Robert Hirst, 1992, Barcelona and 1996 Atlanta Olympian in sailing for the British Virgin Islands.
Jesse Kirkland, 2012 London Olympian in sailing for Bermuda
Zander Kirkland, 2012 London Olympian in sailing for Bermuda
Jayson Megna, 2009, NHL forward for the Anaheim Ducks
Jaycob Megna, 2011, NHL defenseman for the Seattle Kraken
Charlie Ogletree, four time Olympian in sailing and silver medalist at the 2004 Athens Olympics
John P. Riley Jr., coach of the US Olympic Gold Medal ice hockey team in 1960; player, US Olympic ice hockey team (1948); ice hockey coach, West Point Military Academy for over 30 years
Rich Brennan, former NHL hockey player
Jared Shuster (born 1998), baseball pitcher, first round 2020 MLB draft pick
Peter Teravainen, 1974, former PGA Tour and European Tour golfer
Peter Ferraro, former NHL hockey player and NCAA national champion
Chris Ferraro, former NHL hockey player and NCAA national champion

Other
Richard T. Nolan, writer, professor, Episcopal priest

References

External links
Listing at The Association of Boarding Schools profile
Tabor Sailing Page (archived)

 
1876 establishments in Massachusetts
Boarding schools in Massachusetts
Co-educational boarding schools
Educational institutions established in 1876
Marion, Massachusetts
Private high schools in Massachusetts
Private preparatory schools in Massachusetts
Schools in Plymouth County, Massachusetts